The 43rd Daytime Emmy Awards, presented by the National Academy of Television Arts and Sciences (NATAS), "recognizes outstanding achievement in all fields of daytime television production and are presented to individuals and programs broadcast from 2:00 a.m. to 6:00 p.m. during the 2015 calendar year". The ceremony took place on May 1, 2016,  at the Westin Bonaventure Hotel and Suites in Los Angeles, California.

The drama pre-nominees were announced on January 27, 2016, and the standard nominations were announced on March 24, 2016, during an episode of The Talk for a second year in a row. The 43rd Daytime Creative Arts Emmy Awards ceremony, for extended Daytime Emmy categories, was held on April 29, 2016, with the venue also being the Westin Bonaventure Hotel. On March 24, 2016, the NATAS announced that despite the success of the previous year's ceremony on Pop, that the 2016 ceremony will forgo a traditional television broadcast for the second time citing "the current climate for awards shows". The 2014 ceremony also forwent a traditional television broadcast due to a lack of a suitable broadcast partner in time for the ceremony. On April 6, 2016, it was announced that the Lifetime Achievement Award would be presented to Sonia Manzano.

Submission change
In addition to multiple changes for Creative Arts categories, the Academy announced a submission change for the 43rd Daytime Emmy Awards. For the Blue Ribbon Judging round, performers from the six Drama performer categories can now submit up to 20 minutes of appearances from any two episodes from the 2015 calendar year, rather than from one single episode as had been done for several previous years. Thirty-minute programs have the option of using material from up to four episodes, specifically from two sets of two consecutive episodes.

Winners and nominees

Winners are listed first, highlighted in boldface, and indicated with a double dagger.

Lifetime Achievement Award
 Sonia Manzano

Presenters and performances

The following individuals presented awards or performed musical acts.

Presenters (in order of appearance)

Performers

References

043
Daytime Emmy Awards
Daytime